Otunba Adeniyi Adebayo (born 4 February 1958) is a Nigerian lawyer and politician who has served as minister of Industry, Trade and Investment of Nigeria since August 2019. He previously served as governor of Ekiti State from 29 May 1999 to 29 May 2003 on the platform of the Alliance for Democracy (AD). 

He is currently a member of the All Progressives Congress, and is a top chieftain in the party. He was appointed minister of Trade in August 2019, by president Muhammadu Buhari following the announcement of his second cabinet. Adebayo has extensive experience in a wide range of disputes & legal and advisory work. His more notable achievements have been in the areas of project finance, oil and gas, contract procurement and business facilitation. He is a member of Nigerian Bar Association (NBA) and the International Bar Association (IBA).

Education 
He attended University of Lagos where he studied Law and obtained (LL.B Hons).

Personal life 
Adebayo is a keen sportsman and plays tennis, squash and football.

References

1958 births
Living people
Governors of Ekiti State
Alliance for Democracy (Nigeria) politicians
University of Lagos alumni